Racquetball was part of the first World Games in 1981 at Santa Clara. These competitions also count as the first Racquetball World Championships. Racquetball was not played at the World Games in 1989, 1997, 2001, and 2005 as no court was available.

Medalists
Source

Men's Single

Men's Double

Women's Single

Women's Double

Medal table

References

External links
 World Games Results by IRF
 World Games 2013

 
Racquetball
World Games